John Balliol (also known as John of Scotland or John I of Scotland was King of Scots from 1292 to 1296.

John Balliol or John of Balliol or John de Balliol may also refer to:

John I de Balliol (died c. 1269), father of the king
John Balliol (play), play about the king

de:John de Balliol
fr:Jean de Bailleul